Ramboldia blastidiata is a species of saxicolous (rock-dwelling) and crustose lichen in the family Lecanoraceae. Found in Australia, it was formally described as a new species in 2007 by lichenologists Gintaras Kantvilas and John Elix. The authors suggest that it is widespread in temperate Australia and Tasmania, but not commonly collected. Others saxicolous lichens that it usually grows with include Ramboldia petraeoides, Lecanora farinacea, Xanthoparmelia mougeotina, and species from the genera Buellia and Rhizocarpon. The specific epithet blastidiata refers to the presence of blastidia, which are vegetative propagules that contain mycobiont and photobiont and are produced by yeast-like budding.

References

Lecanorales
Lichen species
Lichens described in 2007
Lichens of Australia
Taxa named by John Alan Elix
Taxa named by Gintaras Kantvilas